CJ-5 may refer to:

 Jeep CJ-5, American automobile
 Nanchang CJ-5, Chinese aircraft